Cymindis singularis is a species of ground beetle in the subfamily Harpalinae. It was described by Rosenhauer in 1856.

References

simplex
Beetles described in 1856